Odontoloxozus is a genus of cactus flies in the family Neriidae.

Species
Odontoloxozus longicornis (Coquillett, 1904) (longhorn cactus fly)
Odontoloxozus pachycericola Mangan & Baldwin, 1986
Odontoloxozus peruanus Hennig, 1937

References

Brachycera genera
Neriidae
Taxa named by Günther Enderlein
Diptera of North America
Diptera of South America